Joseph Bow Waters (29 April 1882 – 30 June 1954) was a Scottish rugby union player.

He was capped twice in 1904 . He also played for Cambridge University RFC.

He was the father of Frank Waters, who was also capped for Scotland.

References
 Bath, Richard (ed.) The Scotland Rugby Miscellany (Vision Sports Publishing Ltd, 2007 )

1882 births
1954 deaths
Cambridge University R.U.F.C. players
Scotland international rugby union players
Scottish rugby union players